Greece competed at the 1956 Summer Olympics in Melbourne, Australia. Greek athletes have competed in every Summer Olympic Games. Thirteen competitors, all men, took part in thirteen events in five sports.

Medalists

Athletics

Men's 110m Hurdles 
Ioannis Cambadellis
 Heat — 15.1s (→ did not advance)

Rowing

Greece had one male rowers participate in one out of seven rowing events in 1956.

 Men's single sculls
 Nikos Khatzigiakoumis

Sailing

Shooting

Two shooters represented Greece in 1956.

25 m pistol
 Vangelis Khrysafis

Trap
 Ioannis Koutsis

Wrestling

References

External links
Official Olympic Reports
International Olympic Committee results database

Nations at the 1956 Summer Olympics
1956
Summer Olympics